Neuvillers-sur-Fave is a commune in the Vosges department in Grand Est in northeastern France.

Inhabitants are called Neuvillois.

Geography
The village of Neuvillers is positioned between Frapelle and the little hamlet of Vanifosse on the little river Fave.

See also
Communes of the Vosges department

References

Communes of Vosges (department)